Dr Riem Hussein (born 26 July 1980) is a German international football referee. She has been officiating internationally since 2009.

Career
Since 2015, Hussein has been a referee in Germany's third tier of men's football, the 3. Liga.

Hussein was appointed to be a referee at the 2019 FIFA Women's World Cup in France. She was also appointed to be a referee at the UEFA Women's Euro 2022 in England.

Hussein also officiated the 2021 UEFA Women's Champions League Final between Chelsea and Barcelona.

Personal life
Hussein is of Palestinian descent who primarily works as a pharmacist. In 2009, she obtained a PhD from the Technical University of Braunschweig.

References

Living people
1980 births
German football referees
FIFA Women's World Cup referees
Women association football referees
German people of Palestinian descent
German pharmacists
Technical University of Braunschweig alumni
UEFA Women's Euro 2022 referees